Deborah is the sixth studio album by American singer-songwriter Debbie Gibson. Released on June 11, 1997 under Gibson's own record label, Espiritu Records, this was the first release where the singer was credited with her full name. The original release sold to Debbie Gibson International Fan Club (DGIF) members includes her covers of "People" and "Don't Rain on My Parade" from Funny Girl, as she starred in the off-Broadway production tour of the musical the previous year. The second release for the general market replaced the Funny Girl covers with "Only Words" (Dance Edit) and a re-recording of Gibson's 1987 debut single "Only in My Dreams".

In Japan, the album was released as Moonchild on November 29, 1997 by Nippon Columbia under the Portazul label. It includes all tracks from both versions of the U.S. release.

The album was included in the 2017 box set We Could Be Together, with the track listing based on the original DGIF release and two additional songs and three remixes as bonus tracks.

Singles
"Only Words" is the first dance maxi-single from the album. Released in the U.S. in 1997 and peaking at #38 on the Hot Dance chart,
"Moonchild" released in 1997.
"Naturally" is the third and final single from Deborah Gibson's album, released in 1997. "Naturally" was released as a single exclusively in Japan in 1998.

Track listing

Personnel 
Deborah Gibson - vocals, backing vocals, piano, musical arrangements, keyboards
Carlos Alomar – acoustic & electric guitar 
Reynaldo Andrews – handclapping
Carlton Batts – mastering
Bob Biles – sound engineering
Anna-Jane Casey – vocals, performance
Chris Childs – bass
Robin Clark – background vocals 
Richard Cottle – keyboards
Richard Drummie – guitar, mandolin, musical arrangement, production, drum programming, keyboard programming
Dave Goodermuth – assistant engineer
Marc Goodman – sound engineering
Andy Grassi – vocals, sound engineering, mixing
Dave Hancock – mixing assistant
Bashiri Johnson – percussion
Larry Knight – acoustic & electric guitar
David Matthews – sound engineering
P. Dennis Mitchell – sound engineering, mixing
Richie Morales – drums
Joey Moskowitz – programming
B.J. Nelson – backing vocals
Rafael Padilla – percussion
Dean Parks – acoustic guitar
John Patitucci – bass samples
George Perilli – drums
Mark Portmann – arrangement, production, sound engineering, keyboard programming
Sally Ries – backing vocals
Andrea Robinson – backing vocals
Alex Rodriguez – mixing
Steve Rosen – piano, arrangement, keyboards, production
Tom Salta – keyboards, programming
Bill Schnee – mixing
Michael Thompson – electric guitar
Fonzi Thornton – backing vocals
Junior Vasquez – production, mixing, post production

References

External links
 
 
 

Deborah (Deborah Gibson album)
Deborah (Deborah Gibson album)
Self-released albums